is a Japanese voice actress and singer associated by Atomic Monkey. Miyahara debuted as a voice actress in 1998 as Shouko Yamanobe in Mamotte Shugogetten. Notable roles she has played include Momoko Asuka and Masaru Yada from the Ojamajo Doremi series, Wallace from Digimon Adventure 02, Miyako Gōtokuji/Rolling Bubbles from Powerpuff Girls Z, Lyuze from Casshern Sins, and Akari Tsukumo from Yu-Gi-Oh! Zexal.

In addition to her voice acting, Miyahara also pursued a singing career and released her first extended play, Reason, in 2003. She also provided vocals for Genki Rockets.

Early life 
When Miyahara was in junior high, she and her family moved to Austria, where she attended an international school and learned English.

Career

Voice acting career 
Miyahara began her voice acting career in 1997.

Musical career 
Miyahara pursued a musical career alongside her voice acting works. Aside from performing image songs associated with some of the characters she voiced, she performs at open mics. She released her first indies album, titled REASON, in 2003. Miyahara also lent her vocals to some of Genki Rockets' songs as part of fictional space girl Lumi's image.

Miyahara was also a featured artist in one of FreeTEMPO's albums.

Personal life
Miyahara gave birth to a boy on July 29, 2019.

Discography

Extended plays

Singles

As featured artist

Filmography

References

External links 
 

1978 births
Living people
Japanese child actresses
Japanese video game actresses
Japanese voice actresses
Singers from Tokyo
Voice actresses from Tokyo
21st-century Japanese singers
21st-century Japanese women singers